Matthew Driscoll is an American college basketball coach who is currently head coach of the University of North Florida Ospreys. Before coming to UNF, Driscoll spent twelve years as an assistant at Baylor University, Valparaiso University, Clemson University and the University of Wyoming. In a May 2008 Fox Sports survey of his peers, Driscoll was rated as one of the top 10 assistants in the country.

Career
A native of Pittsburgh, Driscoll is a 1992 graduate of Slippery Rock University. From 1993 to 1997, he was the head coach at LaRoche College in Pittsburgh. He is a board member of the National Association of Basketball Coaches (NABC) and a former president. His first stint as a Division I assistant was the 1997–98 season under Larry Shyatt for the Wyoming Cowboys, which resulted in a trip to the NIT. He then followed Shyatt as an assistant for the Clemson Tigers from 1998 to 2003. While at Clemson, Driscoll help lead the Tigers to the 1999 NIT finals and three wins over the North Carolina Tar Heels, including one when the Heels were ranked number 1 in the country.

In 2003, Driscoll spent seven weeks with Scott Drew at Valparaiso University before Drew accepted a job with the Baylor Bears, and Driscoll followed. At Baylor, Driscoll's primary responsibilities included on-court development, scouting, recruiting, and administrative duties. In his six years there, Driscoll helped revive the program from tragedy and NCAA sanctions. Baylor went from struggling under NCAA sanctions for his first several years, to making the NCAA tournament for the first time in twenty years in 2008. In 2009, Baylor lost in the Big 12 Tournament finals to Missouri, and won four games in the NIT before losing to Penn State at Madison Square Garden in the NIT finals. After one of the toughest rebuilding projects in college basketball history, Baylor finished with 21 wins in 2007–08 with wins over Notre Dame, South Carolina and Texas A&M, and 24 wins in 2008–09 with wins over defending national champion Kansas, Texas and Georgetown.

In 2009 Driscoll was hired as head coach of the North Florida Ospreys, succeeding Matt Kilcullen. He is the team's first coach since the University of North Florida completed its transition into NCAA Division I sports. In the 2010–11 he led the Ospreys to their first appearance in the ASUN Conference playoffs, in their second season of tournament eligibility. They upset Jacksonville University and East Tennessee State University to advance to the championship game, but were defeated 87–46 by Belmont University.

During the 2011–12 season, Driscoll coached the team to a school record 16 wins in a season, and first-ever season sweep of cross-town rival Jacksonville University.

In the 2014–15 season, Driscoll coached the team to a new school record of 23 wins. He also guided the school to the first ever A-Sun regular season championship and was named Atlantic Sun Coach of the Year. The team then won the 2015 ASUN Conference tournament and earned their first ever bid to the NCAA tournament.  After the season, he agreed to a 4-year contract extension to remain the team's head coach through 2022.

The Ospreys' success continued in the 2015–16 season, winning the Conference regular season championship again.  Driscoll and his staff were named Atlantic Sun Coaching Staff of the Year for the second year in a row.

Driscoll and his wife, Carrie, have two sons.

Head coaching record

College

References

External links
Andy Katz: Matthew Driscoll is up to the task as the men's head basketball coach at North Florida - ESPN
Pittsburgh native Driscoll aims to beat Robert Morris in NCAA tournament - Pittsburgh Post-Gazette

1964 births
Living people
American men's basketball coaches
American men's basketball players
Basketball coaches from Pennsylvania
Basketball players from Pittsburgh
Baylor Bears men's basketball coaches
Clemson Tigers men's basketball coaches
College men's basketball head coaches in the United States
High school basketball coaches in the United States
Junior college men's basketball players in the United States
North Florida Ospreys men's basketball coaches
Slippery Rock men's basketball coaches
Sportspeople from Pittsburgh
Valparaiso Beacons men's basketball coaches
Wyoming Cowboys basketball coaches